Yue Chao (born 5 January 1991) is a Chinese long distance runner who specialises in the marathon. She competed in the women's marathon event at the 2016 Summer Olympics.

References

External links
 

1991 births
Living people
Chinese female long-distance runners
Chinese female marathon runners
Athletes (track and field) at the 2016 Summer Olympics
Olympic athletes of China
Athletes (track and field) at the 2014 Asian Games
Sportspeople from Yangzhou
Asian Games competitors for China
Runners from Jiangsu